This article serves as an index - as complete as possible - of all the honorific orders or similar decorations received by the Japanese Imperial Family, classified by continent, awarding country and recipient.

Honours by Japan 

 Emperor Naruhito : 
 Collar and Grand Cordon of the Order of the Chrysanthemum
 Grand Cordon of the Order of the Paulownia Flowers
 Grand Cordon of the Order of the Sacred Treasure
 Order of Culture
 The Golden Medal of Merit of the Japanese Red Cross
 The Golden Medal of Honorary Member of the Japanese Red Cross
 The Golden Pheasant Award
 Empress Masako : 
 Grand Mistress and Grand Cordon of the Order of the Precious Crown
 The Golden Medal of Merit of the Japanese Red Cross
 The Golden Medal of Honorary Member of the Japanese Red Cross
 Aiko, Princess Toshi : 
 Grand Cordon of the Order of the Precious Crown
  Emperor Emeritus Akihito : 
 Collar and Grand Cordon of the Supreme Order of the Chrysanthemum
 Grand Cordon of the Order of the Rising Sun with the Paulownia Blossoms 
 renamed Grand Cordon of the Order of the Paulownia Flowers from 2003
 Grand Cordon of the Order of the Sacred Treasure
 Order of Culture
 The Golden Medal of Merit of the Japanese Red Cross
 The Golden Medal of Honorary Member of the Japanese Red Cross
 The Golden Pheasant Award
 Empress Emerita Michiko : 
 Grand Cordon of the Order of the Precious Crown
 The Golden Medal of Merit of the Japanese Red Cross
 The Golden Medal of Honorary Member of the Japanese Red Cross
 Fumihito, Crown Prince Akishino : Grand Cordon of the Order of the Chrysanthemum
 Kiko, Crown Princess Akishino :
 Grand Cordon of the Order of the Precious Crown
 The Golden Medal of Merit of the Japanese Red Cross
 The Golden Medal of Honorary Member of the Japanese Red Cross
 Princess Kako of Akishino : Grand Cordon of the Order of the Precious Crown
 Masahito, Prince Hitachi : Grand Cordon of the Order of the Chrysanthemum
 Hanako, Princess Hitachi : 
 Grand Cordon of the Order of the Precious Crown
 The Golden Medal of Merit of the Japanese Red Cross
 The Golden Medal of Honorary Member of the Japanese Red Cross
 Yuriko, Princess Mikasa :
 Grand Cordon of the Order of the Precious Crown
 The Golden Medal of Merit of the Japanese Red Cross
 The Golden Medal of Honorary Member of the Japanese Red Cross
 Princess Tomohito of Mikasa (Nobuko) : 
 Grand Cordon of the Order of the Precious Crown
 The Golden Medal of Merit of the Japanese Red Cross
 The Golden Medal of Honorary Member of the Japanese Red Cross
 Princess Akiko of Mikasa : Member of the Order of the Precious Crown, 2nd Class
 Princess Yōko of Mikasa : Member of the Order of the Precious Crown, 2nd Class
 Hisako, Princess Takamado :
 Grand Cordon of the Order of the Precious Crown
 The Golden Medal of Merit of the Japanese Red Cross
 The Golden Medal of Honorary Member of the Japanese Red Cross
 Princess Tsuguko of Takamado : Member of the Order of the Precious Crown, 2nd Class

Former members
 Atsuko Ikeda (Emperor Shōwa's daughter) : Grand Cordon of the Order of the Precious Crown
 Takako Shimazu (Emperor Shōwa's daughter) : Grand Cordon of the Order of the Precious Crown
 Yasuko Konoe (Prince Mikasa's daughter) : Grand Cordon of the Order of the Precious Crown
 Masako Sen (Prince Mikasa's daughter) : Grand Cordon of the Order of the Precious Crown
 Sayako Kuroda (Emperor Emeritus Akihito's daughter) : Grand Cordon of the Order of the Precious Crown
 Noriko Senge (Prince Takamado's daughter) : Member of the Order of the Precious Crown, 2nd Class
 Ayako Moriya (Prince Takamado's daughter) : Member of the Order of the Precious Crown, 2nd Class
 Mako Komuro (Crown Prince Akishino's daughter) : Grand Cordon of the Order of the Precious Crown

Foreign honours by the countries of the Americas

Brazil 
 Emperor Emeritus Akihito : Grand Collar of the Order of the Southern Cross

Chile 
 Emperor Emeritus Akihito: Collar of the Order of the Merit of Chile

Colombia 
 Emperor Emeritus Akihito : Grand Cross of the Order of the Cross of Boyaca

Mexico 
 Emperor Emeritus Akihito : Collar of the Order of the Aztec Eagle

Panama 
 Emperor Emeritus Akihito : Collar of the Order of Manuel Amador Guerrero

Paraguay 
 Fumihito, Crown Prince Akishino: Grand Cross of the National Order of Merit

Peru 
 Emperor Emeritus Akihito : Grand Cross with diamonds of the Order of the Sun
 Fumihito, Crown Prince Akishino : Grand Cross of the Order of the Sun
 Kiko, Crown Princess Akishino : Grand Cross of the Order of the Sun

Foreign honours by the countries of Africa

Botswana 
 Emperor Emeritus Akihito : Presidential Order

Cameroon 
 Emperor Emeritus Akihito: Order of Valour Grand Cordon

Democratic Republic of the Congo 
 Emperor Emeritus Akihito : Grand Cordon of the National Order of the Leopard

Côte d'Ivoire 
 Emperor Emeritus Akihito : Grand Cordon of the National Order of the Ivory Coast

Egypt 
 Emperor Emeritus Akihito : Grand Collar of the Order of the Nile

Ethiopian Empire 
 Emperor Emeritus Akihito: Grand Cordon of the Order of the Seal of Solomon (1960)
 Empress Emerita Michiko: Grand Cordon of the Order of the Queen of Sheba (1960)

Kenya 
 Emperor Emeritus Akihito : Order of the Golden Heart of Kenya

Gambia 
 Emperor Emeritus Akihito : Grand Commander of the Order of the Republic of Gambia

Liberia 
 Emperor Emeritus Akihito : 
 Knight Grand Band of the Order of the Star of Africa 
 Knight Grand Band of the Order of the Pioneers of Liberia

Malawi 
 Emperor Emeritus Akihito : Grand Commander of the Order of the Lion

Mali 
 Emperor Emeritus Akihito : Grand Cordon of the National Order of Mali

Morocco 
 Emperor Emeritus Akihito : Grand Collar of the Order of Muhammad

Nigeria 
 Emperor Emeritus Akihito: Grand Cordon of the Order of the Federal Republic

Senegal 
 Emperor Emeritus Akihito : Grand Cordon of the Order of the Lion

South Africa 
 Emperor Emeritus Akihito: Grand Cross in Gold of the Order of Good Hope

Foreign honours by the countries of Asia

Middle East

Bahrain 
 Emperor Naruhito : Collar of the Order of al-Khalifa
 Emperor Emeritus Akihito : Collar of the Order of al-Khalifa

Iran 
 Princess Mikasa (Yuriko) : 
 Order of the Pleiades, 2nd Class
 Commemorative Medal of the 2500th Anniversary of the founding of the Persian Empire (14 October 1971)

Jordan 
 Emperor Emeritus Akihito : Collar of the Order of al-Hussein bin Ali
 Empress Emerita Michiko : Grand Cordon of the Supreme Order of the Renaissance

Kuwait 
 Emperor Emeritus Akihito : Great Collar of the Order of Mubarak the Great

Oman 
 Emperor Emeritus Akihito : Superior Class of the Order of Oman

Qatar 
 Emperor Naruhito : Necklace of Merit
Emperor Emeritus Akihito : Collar of Independence

Saudi Arabia 
 Emperor Emeritus Akihito : Badr Chain

Far East

Afghanistan 
 Emperor Emeritus Akihito : Order of the Supreme Sun

Indonesia 
 Emperor Emeritus Akihito: Star of the Republic of Indonesia, Adipurna (1st Class)
 Empress Emerita Michiko: Star of Mahaputera, Adipurna (1st class)

Malaysia 
 Emperor Naruhito : Honorary Grand Commander of the Order of the Defender of the Realm (2012)
 Empress Masako : Honorary Grand Commander of the Order of the Defender of the Realm (2012)
 Emperor Emeritus Akihito : Honorary Recipient of the Order of the Crown of the Realm
 Empress Emerita Michiko : Honorary Recipient of the Order of the Crown of the Realm

Nepal 
 Emperor Emeritus Akihito: 
 Member of the Order of the Benevolent Ruler (19 April 1960)
 Coronation Medal of H.M. King Birendra (25 February 1975)
  Empress Emerita Michiko: 
 Member of the Order of the Benevolent Ruler (19 April 1960)
 Coronation Medal of H.M. King Birendra (25 February 1975)
 Prince Hitachi (Masahito) : Member of the Order of the Benevolent Ruler (19 April 1960)
 Princess Hitachi (Hanako) : Member of the Order of the Benevolent Ruler (19 April 1960)

Pakistan 
 Emperor Emeritus Akihito : Nishan-e-Pakistan, 1st Class

Philippines 
 Emperor Naruhito : 
 Grand Collar of the Order of Sikatuna, Rank of Raja (December 3, 2002)
 Emperor Emeritus Akihito : 
 Grand Collar of the Order of Lakandula, Rank of Supremo (June 3, 2015)
 Grand Collar of the Ancient Order of Sikatuna, Rank of Raja (November 10, 1962)
 Chief Commander of the Philippine Legion of Honor (December 3, 2002)
 Empress Emerita Michiko : 
 Order of Gabriela Silang (December 3, 2002)

Thailand 
 Emperor Emeritus Akihito: 
 The Most Auspicious Order of the Rajamitrabhorn
 The Most Illustrious Order of the Royal House of Chakri
 Empress Emerita Michiko : Dame of the Order of the Royal House of Chakri

Foreign honours by the countries of Oceania

Tonga 
 Emperor Naruhito : 
 Knight Grand Cross with Collar of the Order of the Crown of Tonga (1 August 2008)
 Coronation Medal of H.M. King George Tupou V (1 August 2008)
 Coronation Medal of H.M. King Tupou VI (4 July 2015)
 Empress Masako : 
 Dame Grand Cross of the Order of Queen Salote Tupou III (4 July 2015)
 Coronation Medal of H.M. King Tupou VI (4 July 2015)

Foreign honours by the countries of Europe

Austria 

 Emperor Naruhito : Grand Decoration of Honour in Gold with Sash for Services to the Republic of Austria (1999)
 Empress Masako : Grand Decoration of Honour in Gold with Sash for Services to the Republic of Austria (1999) 
 Emperor Emeritus Akihito : Grand Star of the Decoration for Services to the Republic of Austria (1999)
 Empress Emerita Michiko : Grand Star of the Decoration for Services to the Republic of Austria (1999)

Belgium 
 Emperor Naruhito : Grand Cordon of the Order of Leopold (22 October 1996)
 Empress Masako : Grand Cordon of the Order of Leopold (11 October 2016)
 Emperor Emeritus Akihito : Grand Cordon of the Order of Leopold
 Empress Emerita Michiko : Grand Cordon of the Order of Leopold
 Prince Akishino : Grand Cross of the Order of the Crown (11 October 2016)
 Princess Akishino : Grand Cross of the Order of the Crown (11 October 2016)

Czech Republic 
 Emperor Emeritus Akihito : 1st Class (Civil Division) with Collar Chain of the Order of the White Lion

Denmark 

 Emperor Naruhito : Knight of the Elephant (16/11/2004)
 Emperor Emeritus Akihito : Knight of the Elephant (08/08/1953)
 Empress Emerita Michiko : Knight of the Elephant (02/06/1998)
 Prince Hitachi (Masahito) : Knight of the Elephant (28/09/1965)

Estonia 
 Emperor Emeritus Akihito : Collar of the Order of the Cross of Terra Mariana

Finland 
 Emperor Emeritus Akihito : Grand Cross with Collar of the Order of the White Rose

France 
 Emperor Emeritus Akihito : Grand Cross of the Légion d'honneur
 Empress Emerita Michiko : Grand Cross of the Ordre national du Mérite

Germany 

 Emperor Naruhito : Grand Cross 1st Class of the Order of Merit of the Federal Republic of Germany
 Emperor Emeritus Akihito : Grand Cross Special Class of the Order of Merit of the Federal Republic of Germany 
 Empress Emerita Michiko :  Grand Cross Special Class of the Order of Merit of the Federal Republic of Germany

Greece 
 Emperor Emeritus Akihito : Grand Cross of the Order of the Redeemer
 Empress Emerita Michiko : Grand Cross of the Order of the Redeemer

Hungary 
 Emperor Emeritus Akihito : Grand Cross with Chain of the Order of Merit of the Republic of Hungary
 Empress Emerita Michiko : Grand Cross with Chain of the Order of Merit of the Republic of Hungary

Iceland 
 Emperor Emeritus Akihito : Grand Cross with Collar of the Order of the Falcon

Italy 
 Emperor Naruhito : Knight Grand Cross of the Order of Merit of the Italian Republic (09/03/1982)
 Emperor Emeritus Akihito : Knight Grand Cross (09/03/1982)  later with Collar (12/04/1998) of the Order of Merit of the Italian Republic
 Empress Emerita Michiko : Grand Cross of the Order of Merit of the Italian Republic (12/04/1998)
 Crown Prince Akishino : Knight Grand Cross of the Order of Merit of the Italian Republic(12/04/1998)
 Prince Hitachi (Masahito) : Grand Cross of the Order of Merit of the Italian Republic (22/11/1965)

Kazakhstan 
 Emperor Emeritus Akihito : Order of the Golden Eagle

Latvia 
 Emperor Emeritus Akihito : Commander Grand Cross with Chain of the Order of the Three Stars

Lithuania 
 Emperor Emeritus Akihito : Grand Cross with Collar of the Order of Vytautas the Great (22/05/2007)
 Empress Emerita Michiko : Grand Cross of the Order of Vytautas the Great (22/05/2007)

Luxembourg 

 Emperor Naruhito: Knight of the Order of the Gold Lion of the House of Nassau
 Empress Masako: Knight of the Order of the Gold Lion of the House of Nassau
 Emperor Emeritus Akihito: Knight of the Order of the Gold Lion of the House of Nassau
 Empress Emerita Michiko: Knight of the Order of the Gold Lion of the House of Nassau
 Prince Akishino: Grand Cross of the Order of Adolphe of Nassau
 Princess Akishino: Grand cross of the Order of Adolphe of Nassau

Netherlands 

 Emperor Naruhito : Grand Cross of the Order of the Crown (1991)
 Recipient of the King Willem-Alexander Inauguration Medal (2013)
 Empress Masako : Grand Cross of the Order of the Crown (29 October 2014)
 Recipient of the King Willem-Alexander Inauguration Medal (2013)
 Emperor Emeritus Akihito : Knight Grand Cross of the Order of the Netherlands Lion
 Empress Emerita Michiko : Knight Grand Cross of the Order of the Netherlands Lion 
 Prince Akishino : Grand Cross of the Order of the Crown (29 October 2014)
 Princess Akishino : Grand Cross of the Order of the Crown (29 October 2014)

Norway 

 Emperor Naruhito : Grand Cross of the Order of St. Olav (26/03/2001)
 Empress Masako : Grand Cross of the Order of St. Olav (26/03/2001)
 Emperor Emeritus Akihito : Grand Cross (1953) with Collar (26/03/2001) of the Royal Norwegian Order of St. Olav
 Empress Emerita Michiko : Grand Cross of the Order of St. Olav (26/03/2001)
 Princess Tomohito of Mikasa (Nobuko) : Grand Cross of the Order of St. Olav (26/03/2001)

Poland 
 Emperor Emeritus Akihito : Order of the White Eagle
 Empress Emerita Michiko : Order of the White Eagle

Portugal 
 Emperor Naruhito : Grand Cross of the Order of Christ (02/12/1993)
 Empress Masako : Grand Cross of the Order of Prince Henry (02/12/1993)
 Emperor Emeritus Akihito : 
 Grand Collar of the Order of Saint James of the Sword (02/12/1993)
 Grand Collar of the Order of Prince Henry (12/05/1998)
 Empress Emerita Michiko : 
 Grand Cross of the Order of Saint James of the Sword (02/12/1993)
 Grand Cross of the Order of Prince Henry (12/05/1998)
 Princess Takamado (Hisako) : Grand Cross of the Order of Prince Henry (02/12/1993)

Spain 

 Emperor Naruhito : Knight Grand Cross of the Order of Charles III (08/11/2008)
 Empress Masako : Dame Grand Cross of the Order of Isabella the Catholic (08/11/2008)
 Emperor Emeritus Akihito : 
 Knight of the Order of the Golden Fleece (26/02/1985)
 Knight Grand Cross of the Order of Charles III (20/01/1972)
 Knight of the Collar of the Order of Charles III (23/10/1980)
 Empress Emerita Michiko : 
 Dame Grand Cross of the Order of Isabella the Catholic (20/01/1972)
 Dame Grand Cross of the Order of Charles III (07/10/1994)
 Prince Akishino (Fumihito) : Knight Grand Cross of the Order of Isabella the Catholic (08/11/2008)
 Princess Akishino (Kiko) : Dame Grand Cross of the Order of Isabella the Catholic (08/11/2008)
 Princess Takamado (Hisako) : Dame Grand Cross of the Order of Isabella the Catholic (08/11/2008)

Sweden 

 Emperor Naruhito : Knight of the Royal Order of the Seraphim
 Emperor Emeritus Akihito : Knight with Collar of the Royal Order of the Seraphim
 Empress Emerita Michiko : Member of the Royal Order of the Seraphim
 Prince Akishino (Fumihito) : Commander Grand Cross of the Order of the Polar Star
 Princess Akishino (Kiko) : Commander Grand Cross of the Order of the Polar Star

Ukraine 
 Emperor Emeritus Akihito : First Class of the Order of Prince Yaroslav the Wise

United Kingdom 
 Emperor Emeritus Akihito:
 Stranger Knight of the Order of the Garter (985th member; 1998)
 Honorary Knight Grand Cross of the Royal Victorian Order
 Queen Elizabeth II Coronation Medal

Yugoslavia 
 Emperor Emeritus Akihito : Order of the Yugoslav Star

References

Imperial House of Japan
Japan
Orders, decorations, and medals of Japan